Melissa Anne Perry is a Judge of the Federal Court of Australia.

Early life and education

Perry attended Walford Anglican School for Girls. Perry then graduated from the University of Adelaide with a Bachelor of Laws with first class Honours. Perry studied at the University of Cambridge where she was awarded an LLM and PhD in public international law. Her doctorate on State succession, boundaries and territorial regimes was awarded the Yorke Prize.

Career

Perry practiced at the Bar in Australia from 1992 to 2013, and was appointed Queen's Counsel for South Australia in 2004. Perry was admitted to the Bar of England and Wales in 2012.

Perry was appointed as a Judge of the Federal Court of Australia on 23 September 2013. Perry also serves as an additional Judge of the Supreme Court of the Australian Capital Territory, a member of the Defence Force Discipline Appeal Tribunal, and a Deputy President of the Administrative Appeals Tribunal.

Perry is a Foundation Fellow and former Director of the Australian Academy of Law, and is also the Patron for the NSW Chapter of the Hellenic Australian Lawyers Association.

Publications 

 “The Duality of Water: Conflict or Co-operation” (2018 Annual Kirby Lecture on International Law, Australian National University College of Law, Centre for International and Public Law) (to be published in Volume 36, Australian Year Book of International Law at p. 3-27 (forthcoming))
 Melissa Perry and Stephen Lloyd (eds), Australian Native Title Law (2018, 2nd ed, Lawbook Co)
 Melissa Perry, “iDecide: Administrative Decision-Making in the Digital World” (2017) 91 Australian Law Journal 29
 "The High Court and Dynamic Federalism" in Kildea, Lynch & Williams (eds), Tomorrow’s Federation; Reforming Australian Government (2012)
 “Native Title” in Freckelton and Selby (eds), Appealing to the Future: Michael Kirby and his Legacy (2009)
 Melissa Perry and Stephen Lloyd, Australian Native Title Law (2003, 1st ed, Lawbook Co)
 "Chapter III and the Powers of Non-Judicial Tribunals" in Stone and Williams (eds), The High Court at the Crossroads (2000, Federation Press)

See also
List of Judges of the Federal Court of Australia

References

 

Living people
Date of birth missing (living people)
Judges of the Federal Court of Australia
Fellows of the Australian Academy of Law
Australian women judges
Year of birth missing (living people)
Australian King's Counsel